The 1936–37 Cypriot First Division was the 3rd season of the Cypriot top-level football league.

Overview
It was contested by 7 teams, and APOEL F.C. won the championship.

Locations

League standings

Results

References
Cyprus - List of final tables (RSSSF)

Cypriot First Division seasons
Cypriot
1936–37 in Cypriot football